Postojna railway station is a significant railway station in Postojna, Slovenia. It is located on the main railway line between Ljubljana, Slovenia and Trieste, Italy.

The station lies a few kilometres south of the Postojna Gate, a major pass of the Dinaric Alps, where is the highest point on the line between Ljubljana and Trieste.

References

External links 
Official site of the Slovenian railways 
Railway station Postojna on Slovenian tourist portal 

Railway stations in Slovenia